Robert Harley (c. 1706 – 15 March 1774) was a British Member of Parliament.

He was born a younger son of Edward Harley (1664–1735) and his wife Sarah, daughter of Thomas Foley. His elder brother was Edward Harley, 3rd Earl of Oxford.  He was educated at  Westminster School (c. 1715–1719) and at Christ Church, Oxford. he studied law at Lincoln's Inn from 1724 and was called to the bar in 1730.

He was Recorder of Leominster from 1732 to his death and of Tewkesbury from 1756 to 1760 and from 1764 to his death.

He served as Member of Parliament for Leominster on two occasions (1734–1741 and 1742–1747) and for Droitwich from 1754 to his death.

References

Burkes Peerage (1851 edition)

|-

|-

1706 births
1774 deaths
People educated at Westminster School, London
Alumni of Christ Church, Oxford
Members of Lincoln's Inn
Members of the Parliament of Great Britain for English constituencies
British MPs 1734–1741
British MPs 1741–1747
British MPs 1754–1761
British MPs 1761–1768
British MPs 1768–1774
Robert